The Canadian Champion Male Turf Horse is a  Canadian Thoroughbred horse racing honour that is part of the Sovereign Awards program awarded annually to the top male Thoroughbred turf horse competing in Canada. Created in 1975 by the Jockey Club of Canada as a single award for Champion Turf Horse, it was split into male and female categories in 1995.

Past winners

1975 : Victorian Queen (filly)
1976 : Victorian Prince
1977 : Momigi (mare)
1978 : Overskate
1979 : Overskate
1980 : Overskate
1981 : Ben Fab
1982 : Frost King
1983 : Kingsbridge
1984 : Bounding Away
1985 : Imperial Choice
1986 : Carotene
1987 : Carotene
1988 : Carotene
1989 : Charlie Barley
1990 : Izvestia
1991 : Sky Classic
1992 : Rainbows For Life
1993 : Hero's Love
1994 : Alywow
1995 : Hasten To Add
1996 : Chief Bearhart
1997 : Chief Bearhart
1998 : Chief Bearhart
1999 : Thornfield
2000 : Quiet Resolve
2001 : Numerous Times
2002 : Portcullis
2003 : Perfect Soul
2004 : Soaring Free
2005 : A Bit O'Gold
2006 : Sky Conqueror
2007 : Cloudy's Knight
2008 : Rahy's Attorney
2009 : Champs Elysees
2010 : Grand Adventure
2011 : Musketier
2012 : Riding the River
2013 : Forte Dei Marmi 
2014 : Dynamic Sky
2015 : Interpol
2016 : Conquest Enforcer
2017 : Johnny Bear
2018 : Mr Havercamp
2019 : El Tormenta
2020 : Say The Word

References
The Sovereign Awards at the Jockey Club of Canada website

Sovereign Award winners
Horse racing awards
Horse racing in Canada